Brian Lara Cricket '96, known as Lara '96 and Shane Warne Cricket in Australia and New Zealand, is the sequel to Brian Lara Cricket and the second game in the Brian Lara-endorsed series of cricket video games. It was developed by Audiogenic for Codemasters and released in 1996 for the Sega Mega Drive, Amiga and PC systems.

Gameplay
The style and method of game play is almost identical to previous versions of the game. Lara '96 featured the updated player names and statistics of the 1997 cricket season. Notable additional features include the capability to play as English county sides as well as a player editor.

Due to “technical restrictions” the Amiga version of the game depicted all players as white, including Brian Lara himself.

Development
Lara '96 uses the same pseudo-3D graphics used in its predecessor, but the animations and sprites were updated. This game uses a serial EEPROM (24C65 type) for backup.

External links 
 Brian Lara '96 review at Sega-16.com

Amiga games
Brian Lara video games
Cricket video games
Sega Genesis games
1996 video games
Video games developed in the United Kingdom
Multiplayer and single-player video games
Windows games